Arif V 216 is a Turkish comedy film directed by Kıvanç Baruönü and written by Cem Yılmaz. It stars Cem Yılmaz, Ozan Güven, Seda Bakan, Zafer Algöz and Özkan Uğur. It is a sequel to A.R.O.G (2008) and G.O.R.A (2004).

Plot 
Arif, who has returned from Gora to the Earth, is leading a quiet life. Robot 216 suddenly comes to the Earth and tells Arif that he wants to live as a human. Arif and 216 time travel to 1969 with a time machine because the residents do not want an alien in their neighborhood.

Cast

Release 

The premiere for Arif V 216 was held on 3 January 2018 at Zorlu Center in Istanbul. It was released throughout Turkey on 5 January. Special screenings were held on 5–7 January in Istanbul, Ankara and İzmir with the participation of actors. Released in 1,300 theaters across Turkey, it was watched by 1,331,691 people and became the fourth most-watched feature film of all time in Turkey and the one with the most number of viewers in January. On its first week of release, 2,092,000 people watched the film in total and it grossed 27.2 million.

On 11 January, the film was released in a number of European countries. Special screenings were held on 12 January in Berlin, and on 13 January in Amsterdam.

References

External links 
 
 
 

Turkish historical comedy films
2010s science fiction comedy films
2010s historical comedy films
Films shot in Istanbul
Films set in 1969
Films about extraterrestrial life
Films about time travel
Turkish sequel films
Turkish science fiction comedy films
2010s parody films